Rulan Yeh (born 4 September 1984) is an American badminton player who competes in international level events. She is a two-time bronze medalist at the Pan Am Badminton Championships. She is the twin sister of Rulien Yeh who is her doubles partner.

References

American female badminton players
People from Costa Mesa, California
Twin sportspeople
1984 births
Living people
21st-century American women